Isabel II was a  unprotected cruiser of the Spanish Navy, named after Queen Isabella II. The ship fought at San Juan, Puerto Rico, during the Spanish–American War.

Technical characteristics
Isabel II was built at the naval shipyard at Ferrol. Her keel was laid in 1883 and the ship was launched on 19 February 1886. Isabel II was completed in 1888 or 1889. She had one rather tall funnel. She had an iron hull and was rigged as a barque.

Operational history
When the Spanish–American War began in April 1898, Isabel II was at San Juan, Puerto Rico. The U.S. Navy established a permanent blockade of San Juan on 18 June 1898.

On 22 June 1898, Isabel II, gunboat , and destroyer  came out of port to test the blockade, resulting in the Second Battle of San Juan. The auxiliary cruiser  moved in, resulting in a short, running gun battle, from which the Spanish quickly broke away. Two men had been killed aboard Terror, the only casualties either side suffered during the battle.

On 28 June 1898, Isabel II, General Concha, and gunboat  sortied to assist a Spanish blockade runner, the merchant steamer , make it into San Juan's harbor. The three Spanish warships exchanged long-range gunfire with St. Paul, and the cruiser , with neither side scoring any hits. When it became clear that Antonio Lopez would not be able to get past the Americans, the Spanish warships returned to port, where they spent the rest of the war. Antonio López ran aground, but most of her cargo was successfully unloaded by the Spanish.

Isabel II returned to Spain after the end of the war. She was stricken in 1907.

Notes

References
 Chesneau, Roger, and Eugene M. Kolesnik, Eds. Conway's All The World's Fighting Ships 1860–1905. New York, New York: Mayflower Books Inc., 1979. .
 Gray, Randal, Ed. Conway's All The World's Fighting Ships 1906–1921. Annapolis, Maryland: Naval Institute Press, 1985. .
 Nofi, Albert A. The Spanish–American War, 1898. Conshohocken, Pennsylvania:Combined Books, Inc., 1996. .

External links
 Department of the Navy: Naval Historical Center: Online Library of Selected Images: Spanish Navy Ships: Isabel II (Cruiser, 1886–1902)

Velasco-class cruisers
Ships built in Ferrol, Spain
1886 ships
Spanish–American War cruisers of Spain